The Countess of Chester Country Park is a country park in Upton, Chester, Cheshire, England. It is named after the adjacent Countess of Chester Hospital.

History

The country park is a former landfill site which was given to a national charity called The Land Trust by the Homes and Communities Agency in 2012 along with £650,000 to convert the site. Additional funding was provided by WREN, a not-for-profit organisation that gives grants for community work. Natural England's Paths for Communities and the Local Sustainable Transport Fund gave funding to build paths and improve access to Chester town centre, the Hospital and the adjacent Shropshire Union Canal. The park was designed by John Seiler of Cheshire West and Chester Council and opened to the public in June 2014. It was formally opened by Camilla, Duchess of Cornwall in September 2014.

Facilities
The park has a memorial forest allowing bereaved people to plant a tree in memory of a family member. The park has an area of 19 hectares.

Health activities
The park takes its name from the hospital and endeavours to promote health and physical exercise. There are a range of activities including an outdoor gym, guided 'health' walks and Chester Parkrun takes place every Saturday morning.

See also

List of parks and open spaces in Cheshire

References

Parks and open spaces in Cheshire
Chester